Levi Leipheimer's King Ridge GranFondo is a mass participation bicycle ride held each autumn in Sonoma County, California.  Currently, the event draws 5000 professional and amateur athletes from all 50 US states and from six continents.  Sonoma County resident and former professional cyclist Levi Leipheimer founded the ride in 2009.

No GranFondo was held in 2020.

Course/Routes
Levi's GranFondo consists of 11 routes with tiered levels of difficulty. The shortest  and  routes, the Family and Piccolo, respectively, are intended for recreational and beginner cyclists. The  Gran route is the queen course of the event and includes  of climbing along King Ridge above the California coast. The newest route is il Regno (formerly the Panzer), introduced in 2014. To ride il Regno, one must qualify with a finish time of under 7.5 hours on the Gran route. All four routes are paved, but the Medio, Gran, and il Regno routes include an optional alternative over the gravel Willow Creek Road. Participants of all three paths begin together in a mass start peloton of over seven thousand cyclists.

Charities
Levi's GranFondo has a charitable giving component with beneficiaries focused on community-building through investment in youth, health, and cycling. The organizations it benefits have included the Sonoma County Humane Society's Forget Me Not Farm, the NorCal High School Mountain Bike League, Livestrong Foundation, the Dempsey Center for Cancer Hope and Healing, the Pablove Foundation, and the GranFondo's own community giving program. This community giving includes donations to area volunteer fire departments, elementary schools, local parks, and a pothole paving program on popular cycling routes in Sonoma County. Levi's GranFondo has also contributed to the City of Santa Rosa's bid to host stages of the Amgen Tour of California. As of September 2013, cumulative giving totalled over $930,000. An additional $212,000 is expected to be given by the end of 2013.

References

Tourist attractions in Sonoma County, California
Cycling events in the United States
Annual events in California
Sports in Sonoma County, California
Cycling in California